The Archdiocese of Mechelen–Brussels is a Latin Church ecclesiastical territory or archdiocese of the Catholic Church in Belgium. It is the primatial see of Belgium and the centre of the Ecclesiastical Province governed by the Archbishop of Mechelen-Brussels, which covers the whole of Belgium. It was formed in 1559 and the bishop has a seat in two cathedrals, St. Rumbold's Cathedral in Mechelen and the Cathedral of St. Michael and St. Gudula in Brussels. The current archbishop is Jozef De Kesel, who was installed in November 2015.

Overview

The Archdiocese of Mechelen–Brussels consists of the Province of Brabant in addition to eight municipalities in the Province of Antwerp, including Bonheiden, Duffel, Mechelen and Sint-Katelijne-Waver.

In 1995, the Province of Brabant was later split into three areas:
 the Dutch-speaking province of Flemish Brabant;
 the bilingual Brussels-Capital Region;
 the French-speaking province of Walloon Brabant.
The Church did not form new dioceses to fit with this, instead three vicariates general were created, with their own auxiliary bishop, to accommodate the three regional entities.

Language issues
The name differs in the diocese's two languages; the Dutch name of the see is Mechelen–Brussel and in French, it is called Malines–Bruxelles.

In English, Mechelen was traditionally called Mechlin or Malines but now it more commonly remains being called Mechelen. Both Brussel and Bruxelles are called Brussels.

Cathedrals

The duality of the Belgian archbishopric is also reflected in its two active co-cathedrals: St. Rumbold's Cathedral in Mechelen and St. Michael and St. Gudula Cathedral in Brussels.

Collegiate Churches and Chapters
Former Chapters in the archdiocese.
 Chapter of Our-Lady: Cathedral of Mechelen
 Chapter of Saint-Peter: Leuven
 Chapter of Saint John the Baptist: Diest
 Chapter of Saint-Sulpicius: Diest
 Chapter of Our-Lady: Aarschot
 Chapter of Saint-Leonard: Zouleeuw
 Chapter of Saint-Germanus: Tillemont
 Chapter of Saint-Michael and Gudule: Brussels Cathedral
 Chapter of Saint-Peter: Anderlecht
 Chapter of Our Lady and Saint-Martin: Aalst
 Chapter of Saint-Peter: Ninove
 Chapter of Saint-Peter: Rosmay
 Chapter of Saint-Hermes
 Chapter of Saint-Berland: Meerbeek
 Chapter of Saint-Paul: Nivelles
 Chapter of Saint-Gertrud: Nivelles

Abbeys
In the territory of the Diocese important abbeys can be found:
 Averbode Abbey
 Affligem Abbey
 Bornem Abbey
 Forest Abbey
 Grimbergen Abbey
 Groenendael Priory
 Dieleghem Abbey
 St. Bernard's Abbey, Hemiksem
 Keizersberg Abbey
 Kortenberg Abbey
 La Cambre Abbey
 Park Abbey
 Rouge-Cloître Abbey
 Vlierbeek Abbey
 Sheen Anglorum Charterhouse

History
The Archbishop of Mechelen–Brussels was historically primate of the whole of the Low Countries following the 1559 reorganisation creating fifteen dioceses. Over time, the two other ecclesiastical provinces broke from Mechelen–Brussels' primacy. Cambrai was already in France and its kings managed gradually to annex French Flanders, and Utrecht and its suffragans in the Dutch republic (later kingdom) would long have their hierarchy suspended because the northern state was a champion of "anti-papist" Calvinism. The Napoleonic 1801 concordat re-drew the whole map again.

The country, by tradition, has the Archbishop of Mechelen made a cardinal.

The Archdiocese of Mechelen was renamed the Archdiocese of Mechelen–Brussels on 8 December 1961 as part of a restructuring of the Catholic dioceses in Belgium. Two new dioceses were created. On the same day, the Diocese of Antwerp was created from areas previously administered by the Archdiocese of Mechelen. Six years later the Diocese of Hasselt was also created. This meant that the new dioceses largely corresponding to the provinces of Belgium. Most of the Catholic Church's presence in the Province of Antwerp (except in the municipality of Mechelen) was made into the Diocese of Antwerp.

Archbishop André-Joseph Leonard succeeded Cardinal Danneels in January 2010. On 22 February 2011, Pope Benedict XVI appointed: Fr. Jean Kockerols, Fr. Jean-Luc Hudsyn, and Fr. Leon Lemmens as Auxiliary bishops of the Archdiocese of Mechelen-Brussels. Upon reaching 75 years Leonard tendered his resignation, which was accepted. In the autumn of 2015 Pope Francis appointed the bishop of Bruges, Jozef De Kesel, as the new archbishop, who was created Cardinal in 2016.

Heraldry

Bishops

Ordinaries

Archbishops of Mechelen
  Cardinal Antoine Perrenot de Granvelle (1561–1582)
  Joannes Hauchin (1583–1589)
  Mathias Hovius (1596–1620)
  Jacobus Boonen (1621–1655)
  Andreas Creusen (1657–1666)
  Joannes Wachtendonck (1667–1668)
  Alphonse de Berghes (1670–1689)
  Humbertus Guilielmus de Precipiano (1690–1711)
  Thomas-Philippe d'Alcase (1715–1759) (Cardinal in 1719)
  Joannes-Henricus von Franckenberg (1759–1801) (Cardinal in 1778)
  Jean-Armand de Bessuéjouls Roquelaure (1802–1809)
  Dominique-Georges-Frédéric Dufour de Pradt (1809–1817)
  François Antoine Marie Constantin de Méan et de Beaurieux (1817–1831)
  Engelbert Sterckx (1832–1867) (Cardinal in 1838)
  Victor-Auguste-Isidore Dechamps (1867–1883) (Cardinal in 1875)
  Pierre-Lambert Goosens (1884–1906) (Cardinal in 1889)
  Desiré-Félicien-François-Joseph Mercier (1906–1926) (Cardinal in 1907)
  Jozef-Ernest van Roey (1926–1961) (Cardinal in 1927)

Archbishops of Mechelen-Brussels
  Leo Joseph Suenens (1962–1979), see name changed 2 weeks after 1961 appointment (Cardinal in 1962)
  Godfried Danneels (1979–2010) (Cardinal in 1983)
  André-Joseph Léonard (2010–2015)
  Jozef De Kesel (2015–present) (Cardinal in 2016)

Coadjutor Archbishop
Christoph Bartholomäus Anton Migazzi Von Waal Und Sonnenthurn (  1751-1756), resigned (did not succeed to this see), and soon appointed Bishop of Vác, Hungary; future Prince-Archbishop of Vienna (1757-1803 ) and Cardinal (1761)

Auxiliary Bishops
Charles André Anthonis (1868-1893)
Étienne Joseph Carton de Wiart (1934-1945), appointed Bishop of Tournai
Jan De Bie (1987-2009)
Luc Alfons De Hovre, S.J. (1982-2002)
Josef De Kesel (2002-2010), appointed Bishop of Bruges; later returned here as Archbishop; future Cardinal
Emiel-Jozef De Smedt 1950–1952), appointed Bishop of Bruges
Jean-Luc Hudsyn (2011-)
Jean Kockerols (2011-)
Paul Lanneau (1982-2002)
Louis Joseph Legraive (1907-1940)
Léon Lemmens (2011-2017)
Pepin de Rosa, O.P. (1562-1569)
Paul Constant Schoenmaekers (1952-1986)
Leo Jozef Suenens (1945-1961), appointed Archbishop here; future Cardinal
Jean Marie van Cauwenbergh (1930-1950)
Victor-Jean-Joseph-Marie van den Branden de Reeth (1879-1909)
Josephus Franciscus van der Stappen (1893-1908)
Honoré Marie Van Waeyenbergh (1954-1971)
Rémy Victor Vancottem (1982-2010), appointed Bishop of Namur
Koenraad Vanhoutte (2018-)
Ghislain de Vroede (1570-1579)
Antoine Alphonse de Wachter (1909-1932)

Other priests of this diocese who became bishops
Joseph-Léon Cardijn, appointed titular archbishop and Cardinal in 1965
Amédée Marie Léon Crooy (Crooij), appointed Bishop of Tournai in 1915
Victor-Auguste-Isidore Dechamps, C.SS.R. (priest here, 1834–1836), appointed Bishop of Namur {Namen} in 1865; later returned here as Archbishop; future Cardinal
Maximilien de Fürstenberg, appointed apostolic delegate and titular archbishop in 1949; future Cardinal
Lodewijk-Jozef Delebecque, appointed Bishop of Ghent in 1838
Pierre-Lambert Goossens, appointed Coadjutor Bishop of Namur in 1883; later returned here as Archbishop; future Cardinal
Jean Jadot, appointed apostolic delegate and titular archbishop in 1968

References

Bibliography

External links
 Archdiocese of Mechelen-Brussels Dutch-language site
 Archdiocese of Mechelen-Brussels French-language site

Mechelen-Brussels
Religious organizations established in the 1550s
1559 establishments in the Holy Roman Empire
Mechelen-Brussels